Omloop van het Waasland ("Circuit of Waasland") is a bicycle road race held annually in the Belgian region of Waasland. Since 2009, it is organized as a 1.2 event on the UCI Europe Tour.

It is also known for being the last professional cycling race in which Eddy Merckx took part before retiring in 1978.

Winners

External links

Cycle races in Belgium
UCI Europe Tour races
Recurring sporting events established in 1965
1965 establishments in Belgium
Sport in East Flanders